The Priest from Kirchfeld may refer to:
 Der Pfarrer von Kirchfeld (The Priest from Kirchfeld), an anti-clerical folkplay by Ludwig Anzengruber
 The Priest from Kirchfeld (1914 film), a 1914 Austrian silent film
 The Priest from Kirchfeld (1926 film), a 1926 German silent film
 The Priest from Kirchfeld (1937 film), a 1937 Austrian film
 The Priest from Kirchfeld (1955 film), a 1955 West German drama film